The 2016–17 season was Preston North End's second consecutive season in the Championship in their 137th year in existence. Along with competing in the Championship, the club will also participate in the FA Cup and League Cup. The season covers the period from 1 July 2016 to 30 June 2017.

Squad

Statistics

|-
|colspan=14|Out on Loan:

|-
|colspan=14|Player who left during the season:

|}

Goals record

Disciplinary Record

Contracts

Transfers

Transfers in

Transfers out

 income  –£1,800,000

Loans in

Loans out

Competitions

Pre-season

Championship

League table

Matches

FA Cup

EFL Cup

Summary

References

Preston North End
Preston North End F.C. seasons